The Obruchev Hills are a group of rounded hills on the coast between Denman Glacier and Scott Glacier. The hills were plotted by the Western Base Party of the Australasian Antarctic Expedition (1911–14) as a great rock face. They were plotted in greater detail from aerial photographs taken by U.S. Navy Operation Highjump (1946–47) and later by a Soviet expedition (1956), which named them after Vladimir Obruchev, Soviet geologist (1863–1956).

References

Hills of Queen Mary Land